The Scepter of the Ancients is the second album by Psycroptic. It was released in 2003 by Unique Leader.

Track listing

Personnel
 Matthew Chalk – Vocals
 Joe Haley – Guitar
 Cameron Grant – Bass
 Dave Haley – Drums

2003 albums
Psycroptic albums
Unique Leader Records albums